Star Township is a civil township of Antrim County in the U.S. state of Michigan. The population was 926 at the 2010 census.

Communities
Alba is an unincorporated community and census-designated place located partially within Star Township.  The western portion of the community extends into Chestonia Township.
Lakes of the North is an unincorporated community and census-designated place located partially within Star Township.  The southern portion of the community extends into Mancelona Township.

Geography

Demographics
As of the census of 2000, there were 745 people, 295 households, and 220 families residing in the township.  The population density was 21.8 per square mile (8.4/km).  There were 532 housing units at an average density of 15.6 per square mile (6.0/km).  The racial makeup of the township was 97.72% White, 1.21% Native American, 0.27% from other races, and 0.81% from two or more races. Hispanic or Latino of any race were 0.94% of the population.

There were 295 households, out of which 27.5% had children under the age of 18 living with them, 66.8% were married couples living together, 4.7% had a female householder with no husband present, and 25.4% were non-families. 21.4% of all households were made up of individuals, and 9.8% had someone living alone who was 65 years of age or older.  The average household size was 2.53 and the average family size was 2.93.

In the township the population was spread out, with 24.0% under the age of 18, 8.5% from 18 to 24, 25.2% from 25 to 44, 25.6% from 45 to 64, and 16.6% who were 65 years of age or older.  The median age was 38 years. For every 100 females, there were 99.2 males.  For every 100 females age 18 and over, there were 96.5 males.

The median income for a household in the township was $37,500, and the median income for a family was $41,618. Males had a median income of $32,321 versus $17,917 for females. The per capita income for the township was $17,896.  About 4.5% of families and 6.7% of the population were below the poverty line, including 12.8% of those under age 18 and 2.6% of those age 65 or over.

References

Townships in Antrim County, Michigan
Townships in Michigan
Populated places established in 1881
1881 establishments in Michigan